The Canada Party was a Canadian political party founded in 2015 and led by former Member of Parliament Jim Pankiw. The party's ideology and platform was outlined in the Gold Book - the party's manifesto, and being party leader Pankiw ran in Saskatoon West as the party's only candidate in the 2015 federal election.

The party was deregistered by Elections Canada on September 9, 2016.

References

External links

Canada Party - Canadian Political Parties and Political Interest Groups - Web Archive created by the University of Toronto Libraries

2015 establishments in Saskatchewan
2016 disestablishments in Saskatchewan
Federal political parties in Canada
Political parties established in 2015
Political parties disestablished in 2016
Organizations based in Saskatoon